Natalie Wilson Crawford is an American operations researcher and military strategist specializing in air defense and military aircraft force planning, affiliated with the RAND Corporation.

Education and career
Crawford is originally from Boonville, Indiana. Her mother, the daughter of a local banker, had degrees in teaching and laboratory technology; her grandmother was a schoolteacher. Her father was a coal miner, farmer, and dry cleaning shop owner. She moved to Santa Monica, California with her family as a teenager, and majored in mathematics at the University of California, Los Angeles, supporting her studies through part-time work.

After graduating, she immediately applied to work for the RAND Corporation, but was not hired. Instead, she obtained a position as a computer programmer at North American Aviation, through a connection with an executive there for whom she had worked as a babysitter. She finally joined the RAND Corporation in 1964, at first working there as a computer programmer in the aeronautics/astronautics department's armament group. She has been a vice president of the corporation, and director of its Project Air Force from 1997 to 2006. On stepping down from this directorship, she became a senior fellow, distinguished chair in air and space policy, and professor in the Frederick S. Pardee RAND Graduate School.

Recognition
Crawford was elected to the National Academy of Engineering in 2001, "for outstanding engineering, development, and analytical contributions to planning for the U.S. Air Force". She was named as a 2017 Honorary Fellow of the American Institute of Aeronautics and Astronautics, the highest distinction of the institute.

She was the recipient of the 2003 Vance R. Wanner Memorial Award of the Military Operations Research Society, of the 2003 Lt. Gen. Glenn A. Kent Leadership Award, of the 2006 Secretary of Defense Medal for Outstanding Public Service, of the Combat Survivability Lifetime Achievement Award of the National Defense Industrial Association, of a 2011 Lifetime Achievement Award of the Air Force Association, and of the 2012 Thomas D. White National Defense Award.

References

Year of birth missing (living people)
Living people
People from Boonville, Indiana
University of California, Los Angeles alumni
American aerospace engineers
American operations researchers
American women engineers
Fellows of the American Institute of Aeronautics and Astronautics
Members of the United States National Academy of Engineering